Eisbrecher is the debut album by German rock band Eisbrecher, released on 26 January 2004  via ZYX Music in Europe and Dancing Ferret Discs Inc. in the US. Original shipments of the CD came packaged with a region-free multimedia DVD and two pressed, blank CDs intended to show the band's position on copyright infringement. The album hit the Deutsche Alternative Charts at No. 13.

Track listing 
 "Polarstern" (Polaris) – 2:32
 "Herz steht still" (Heart Stands Silent) – 3:55
 "Willkommen im Nichts" (Welcome to Nothing) – 4:08
 "Schwarze Witwe" (Black Widow) – 3:52
 "Ruhe" (Peace) – 0:57
 "Angst?" (Fear?) – 4:17
 "Fanatica" – 3:22
 "Taub-stumm-blind" (Deaf – Dumb – Blind) – 5:14
 "Dornentanz" (Thorn Dance) – 4:14
 "Hoffnung" (Hope) – 2:17
 "Eisbrecher" (Icebreaker) – 4:04
 "Frage" (Question) – 4:20
 "Zeichen der Venus" (Sign of the Venus) – 4:09
 "Mein Blut" (My Blood) – 4:24
 "Sakrileg 11" (Sacrilege 11) – 4:22
 "Fanatica (Club Mix)" – 5:15

Personnel 
 Alexander Wesselsky – vocals
 Noel Pix – instruments
 M. Smart – co-wrote various songs

References 

2004 albums
Eisbrecher albums
German-language albums